Lincoln High School was a public high school in Milwaukee, Wisconsin at the corner of Cass and Knapp Streets. It was a part of the Milwaukee Public Schools system. 

It was created in 1920 after the former East Division High School (now Riverside University High School) was moved to new quarters on the east side of the Milwaukee River in 1915.

The high school (by then the smallest high school in the MPS system) was disbanded at the end of the 1979 school year. The building now houses Lincoln Center for the Arts, a middle school.

Lincoln won state championships in the small-school division of boys' cross country in 1953, 1954, 1958 and 1963.

Notable alumni and faculty
Joseph F. Bellante, Jr., politician
Fred Brown, aka "Downtown Freddie" Brown, NBA Player, First Team All American at University of Iowa
Robert Bloch, writer
Elizabeth M. Coggs, politician
Lee Holloway, politician
Al Jarreau, singer
Gus Menos, politician
Oprah Winfrey, talk show host

References 

1920 establishments in Wisconsin
History of Milwaukee
Defunct schools in Wisconsin
1978 disestablishments in Wisconsin
Educational institutions established in 1920
Educational institutions disestablished in 1978